Mones, Monès or Monés may refer to:

People
 Álvaro Mones (born 1942), Uruguayan biologist and paleontologist
 Giovanni Andrea Mones (1759–1803), Italian painter and architect
 Isidro Monés (born 1947), Spanish comic book artist
 Monès Chéry (born 1981), Haitian footballer
 Nicole Mones (born 1952), American novelist and food writer
 Paul Mones, American lawyer and author
 Skylar Mones, American songwriter, record producer, engineer, and arranger

Places
 Monès, a commune in the Haute-Garonne department in southwestern France
 Mones Quintela, a town in the Artigas Department of northern Uruguay

Other uses
 Anoncia mones, a moth in the family Cosmopterigidae

See also
 Mone (disambiguation)